Black Watch Library is a historic library building located at Ticonderoga in Essex County, New York.  It was built in 1905 and is a one-story brick structure with a cruciform plan in the Jacobean Revival style.  It features a blue / green slate gable roof with projecting rafter ends.

It was listed on the National Register of Historic Places in 1988.

References

Library buildings completed in 1905
Libraries on the National Register of Historic Places in New York (state)
Buildings and structures in Essex County, New York
National Register of Historic Places in Essex County, New York
1905 establishments in New York (state)